Aidan Murphy may refer to:
 Aidan Murphy (footballer)
 Aidan Murphy (athlete)